Under the Bed 3 is a 2016 Chinese horror thriller film directed by Shang Yongfeng. It is the third film of the Under the Bed film series and was released in China by Zhejiang Dongyang April Day Entertainment on March 11, 2016.

Plot

Cast
Abby
Jiang Wenxuan
Miao Qing
Liu Liyuan
Song Wei

Reception
The film grossed  on its opening weekend in China.

See also
Under the Bed 2

References

2016 horror films
2016 horror thriller films
Chinese horror thriller films